The 2005 1000 km of Nürburgring was the fourth round of the 2005 Le Mans Series season, held at the Nürburgring, Germany.  It was run on September 4, 2005.

Official results

Class winners in bold.  Cars failing to complete 70% of winner's distance marked as Not Classified (NC).

† - #36 Paul Belmondo Racing was listed as not classified due to failing to complete the final lap of the race.

Statistics
 Pole Position - #15 Zytek Motorsport - 1:44.275
 Fastest Lap - #15 Zytek Motorsport - 1:46.042

External links
 World Sports Racing Prototypes - 2005 1000 km of Nürburgring results

N
6 Hours of Nürburgring
Nurburgring